The Movies That Made Us is an American documentary streaming television series created by Brian Volk-Weiss, and a spin-off to The Toys That Made Us. The four episode debut season of the new series is dedicated to popular movies from the 1980s and 1990s, and tells the stories behind them.

Episodes

Series overview

Season 1 (2019)

Season 2 (2021)

Season 3 (2021)

Notes

References

External links
 
 

American television spin-offs
2019 American television series debuts
2021 American television series endings
2010s American documentary television series
2020s American documentary television series
English-language Netflix original programming
Netflix original documentary television series
Works about film